Ophiohelidae is a family of echinoderms belonging to the order Ophioscolecida.

Genera:
 Ophiohelus Lyman, 1880
 Ophiomyces Lyman, 1869
 Ophiothauma Clark, 1938
 Ophiotholia Lyman, 1880

References

Ophioscolecida
Echinoderm families